Kerala Congress may refer to:
Committee of Kerala INC, See Kerala Pradesh Congress Committee
Other Parties

Active Parties                 
Aikya Kerala Congress
Janadhipathya Kerala Congress
Kerala Congress
Kerala Congress (B)
Kerala Congress (Jacob)
Kerala Congress (Joseph)
Kerala Congress (M)
Kerala Congress (Nationalist)
Kerala Congress (Skaria Thomas)
Kerala Kamaraj Congress
Kerala Vikas Congress

Defunct Parties                  
Kerala Congress (Anti-merger Group).                          
Kerala Congress (Secular)     
Kerala Congress (Thomas)

Kerala Congress Parties